The Deutsches Institut für Urbanistik (English: German Institute of Urban Affairs) is a German think tank. It conducts research on urban development in Germany and in other German-speaking countries or regions.

The institute was founded by the German Association of Cities on 15 February 1973, and was named on 1 October 1973. It is headquartered in Berlin, runs a branch in Cologne and is structured as a company with limited liability.

Leaders
 1973-1978: 
 1978-1981: 
 1981-1992: Dieter Sauberzweig
 1992-2006: Heinrich Mäding
 2006-2013: 
 2013-2018: Martin zur Nedden
 2018–present:

References

This article incorporates information from the German Wikipedia.

Further reading
issued by the institute
 Archiv für Kommunalwissenschaften 
 Deutsche Zeitschrift für Kommunalwissenschaften

External links
 Official site

Scientific organisations based in Germany
1973 establishments in Germany
Urban planning organizations
Non-profit organisations based in Berlin